Factitial lymphedema (also known as "Hysterical edema") is a skin condition produced by wrapping an elastic bandage, cord, or shirt around an extremity, and/or holding the extremity in a dependent and immobile state.

See also 
 Lymphedema
 Skin lesion

References

External links 

Vascular-related cutaneous conditions